Annie Botha  ( Emmett; 3 July 1864 – 20 May 1937) was a South African civic leader and political hostess. She was the wife of Louis Botha, who served as the first Prime Minister of South Africa. She established an orphanage in South Africa and, with Georgiana Solomon, co-founded and chaired the South African Women's Federation.

Biography 
Botha was born Annie Emmett on 3 July 1864 in Swellendam to John Cheere Emmett, a farmer, and his wife, Helen Laetitia Bland. She was raised in the Anglican faith and her family were members of the Church of the Province of Southern Africa. In 1869, her family moved to the Orange Free State and settled on a farm between Harrismith and Vrede. She was educated at St. Michael's School, an Anglican school in Bloemfontein run by the Community of St Michael and All Angels. Botha later taught at the school until she moved with her parents to Vryheid.

While living in Vryheid, she met Louis Botha. They married at the Dutch Reformed Church in Vryheid on 13 December 1886 and had five children. Botha later converted from Anglicanism to Dutch Reformed Protestantism. Shortly after their wedding, they settled on the Waterval Farm in Vryheid.

During the Second Boer War, the family relocated to Pretoria and remained there after the occupation of the city in 1900 by British forces led by Frederick Roberts, 1st Earl Roberts. Botha's husband served as a Boer general and later as Commander in Chief of the Transvall during the war. Herbert Kitchener, 1st Earl Kitchener persuaded Botha to find out if her husband would be willing to meet with him, after it seemed the Boer forces would not surrender. She was granted permission to visit him in Bothasberg, after a journey by train and a mule-pulled wagon. She convinced her husband to meet with Lord Kitchener in Middelburg in February 1901. The meeting was not a success for negotiations but the British proposals became a foundation for further deliberations in May 1902.

In 1901 Botha was allowed to go to Europe, where she remained until the war ended. While there, she hosted Boer generals Koos de la Rey and Christiaan de Wet as they raised money for war victims. She returned to South Africa in 1902 and found that their home had been destroyed, so the family settled in a home on Cilliers Street in Pretoria. After the war, Botha and her husband went on a tour through the countryside to boost moral and provide food and other amenities to the people. On 19 October 1904, with Georgiana Solomon, she co-founded the South African Women's Federation and served as the chairwoman. The charity campaigned for the preservation of Afrikaner culture and people. She stepped down as chairwoman after her husband's election as Prime Minister of the Transvaal Colony but was nominated for a lifetime honorary presidency within the organization.

Botha established the Louis Botha Home for Orphans and Children in Need. In 1911, she travelled to England to attend the wedding of Hamar Greenwood and Margery Spencer.

After her husband's death in 1919, Botha settled on a farm in Rusthof and spent winters in Sezela.

References 

1864 births
1937 deaths
20th-century philanthropists
20th-century South African women
Cape Colony people
Converts to Calvinism
Former Anglicans
Members of the Dutch Reformed Church in South Africa
Orange Free State people
People from Swellendam
Spouses of prime ministers of South Africa
South African people of World War I
South African philanthropists
White South African people
20th-century women philanthropists